Aalbeke is a village in the Belgian province of West Flanders and since 1977 a part of Kortrijk. Aalbeke has 8511 as a postal code and covers an area of 717 ha. The district had 2,953 inhabitants on December 31, 2007. 

Aalbeke is located 6 km southwest of the central area of Kortrijk and is surrounded by Rollegem, Mouscron, Lauwe and Marke. Nearby Aalbeke, the interchange of the E17 and E403 is located.

Mayors
Jacob van de Kerckhove (1679–1699)
Willem de Schynckele (1699–1706)
Joost Cannaert (1706–1717)
Cornelius van den Bulcke (1717–1734)
Noël de Praetere (1734–1740)
Jan Lesaege (1748–1755)
Pieter Cannaert (1755–1761)
Jan van den Bulcke (1761–1763)
Jan-Baptist de Kimpe (1763–1775)
Pieter Cannaert (1775–1789)
Antoon-Frans Lienaert (1789–1792)
Jan de Kimpe (1792–1798)
Pieter Lerouge (1798–1808)
Jan-Baptist Cannaert (1808–1815)
Jan-Jacob Cottignies (1815–1829)
Joseph-Bernard Berton (1829–1842)
Honoré Dufaux (1843–1852)
Pieter-Jan Margo (1852–1857)
Victor Pycke (1858–1868)
Jean-Louis Mullier (1868–1895)
Henri Bonte (1896–1931)
Henri Castel (1931–1932)
Edward Torreele (1933–1939)
Alphons Ovaere (1942–1944)
René Bonte (1944–1946)
Georges Gheysen (1946)
René Vanhoenackere (1947–1964)
Georges Neirynck (1965–1976) 

Sub-municipalities of Kortrijk
Populated places in West Flanders